Uragh Wood (Irish: Tearmann Dúlra Choill na hIúraí) is wood in Tuosist, County Kerry, Ireland, which was designated a nature reserve in 1982. The wood  is largely sessile oak and covers 87 ha. It is owned by the state.

Since Ireland's adoption of the European Union's Habitats Directive, the wood has been included within a Special Area of Conservation of 1,154 ha called "Cloonee and Inchiquin Loughs, Uragh Wood" (Inchiquin  
being the lake next to the wood).

Flora and fauna
Fauna includes:
 The Kerry Slug (listed in annexes II and IV of the Habitats Directive)
 The Lesser horseshoe bat (listed in annex II of the Habitats Directive)

The wood is internationally important for its suite of
hyper-oceanic woodland bryophytes.

Access
There is no public access.

See also
Uragh Stone Circle

References

  

Forests and woodlands of the Republic of Ireland
 
Nature reserves in the Republic of Ireland
Protected areas established in 1982
1982 establishments in Ireland